The Cambridge University by-election was a Parliamentary by-election held on 11-16 February 1911. The constituency returned two Member of Parliament to the House of Commons of the United Kingdom, elected by the first past the post voting system.

Vacancy
Samuel Butcher had been Unionist MP for the seat of Cambridge University since the 1906 general elections. He died on 29 December 1910 at the age of 60.

Electoral history
This was a safe Conservative constituency in which challenger rarely appeared. At both the General Elections in 1910, the two Conservative candidates were returned unopposed. The last contested election was in 1906 when one of the sitting Conservative MPs stood on a platform of Free Trade in opposition to the Unionist tariff reform policies:

Candidates
 Fifty-four-year-old Sir Joseph Larmor was chosen by the Conservatives to defend the seat. He was the Lucasian Professor of Mathematics at Cambridge. He was standing for parliament for the first time.
 Fifty-two-year-old Harold Cox stood on the same Free Trade platform used by Gorst in 1906. Cox however was a former Liberal Party MP, having sat for Preston from 1906 to 1910. He opposed many of the social reform policies of the Liberal government and was defeated at the January 1910 general election, where Gorst was standing as an official Liberal candidate. Since then he was appointed by the Conservative backed Municipal Reform Party as an Alderman for the London County Council. 
 A third candidate appeared in the shape of Thomas Ethelbert Page, who also stood on a Conservative platform. He was standing for parliament for the first time.

Campaign
Polling took place over a five-day period from 11 to 16 February 1911.

Result

Aftermath
Larmoor was re-elected at the following General Election:

References

1911 in England
1911 elections in the United Kingdom
By-elections to the Parliament of the United Kingdom in Cambridge University
20th century in Cambridge